Gary Wilkinson may refer to:

Gary Wilkinson (basketball) (born 1982), American basketball player
Gary Wilkinson (rugby league), English rugby league coach
Gary Wilkinson (snooker player), English snooker player
Gary Wilkinson (comics), see Steve Roberts (comics)

See also
Garry Wilkinson, presenter on World of Sport (Australian TV series)